The Mordovian Autonomous Soviet Socialist Republic (Mordovskaya Avtonomnaya Sovetskaya Sotsialisticheskaya Respublika; , Mordovskjaj Avtonomnaj Sovetskjaj Socialističeskjaj Respublikaś; , Mordovskoj Avtonomnoj Sovetskoj Socialističeskoj Respublikaś) was an autonomous republic of the Russian SFSR within the Soviet Union. It is now known as the Republic of Mordovia, a federal subject of Russia.

History
The Mordovian Autonomous Soviet Socialist Republic was established on December 20, 1934 after the transformation of Mordovian Autonomous Oblast in Kuybyshev Krai. After Kuybyshev Krai was itself transformed into Kuybyshev Oblast, the Mordovian ASSR was separated from it and subordinated directly to the Russian Soviet Federative Socialist Republic.

On December 7, 1990, the Supreme Soviet of the Mordovian ASSR adopted the Declaration on the legal status of the Mordovian Republic, which transformed the republic into the Mordovian Soviet Socialist Republic. The republic was renamed the Republic of Mordovia on January 25, 1994.

See also
Mordovia in the Soviet Union
First Secretary of the Mordovian Communist Party
Flag of the Mordovian Autonomous Soviet Socialist Republic

References

Autonomous republics of the Russian Soviet Federative Socialist Republic
States and territories established in 1934
Former socialist republics
1934 establishments in the Soviet Union
1990 disestablishments in the Soviet Union
History of Mordovia